Ibone Belausteguigoitia (born 23 May 1930) is a Mexican diver. She competed in the women's 3 metre springboard event at the 1948 Summer Olympics.

References

External links
 

1930 births
Living people
Mexican female divers
Olympic divers of Mexico
Divers at the 1948 Summer Olympics
Sportspeople from Bilbao
Spanish emigrants to Mexico